Pseudo-Dionysius the Areopagite (or Dionysius the Pseudo-Areopagite) was a Greek author, Christian theologian and Neoplatonic philosopher of the late 5th to early 6th century, who wrote a set of works known as the Corpus Areopagiticum or Corpus Dionysiacum.

The author pseudepigraphically identifies himself in the corpus as "Dionysios", portraying himself as Dionysius the Areopagite, the Athenian convert of Paul the Apostle mentioned in Acts 17:34.

Historic confusions
In the early sixth century, a series of writings of a mystical nature, employing Neoplatonic language to elucidate Christian theological and mystical ideas, was ascribed to the Areopagite. They have long been recognized as pseudepigrapha, and their author is now called "Pseudo-Dionysius the Areopagite".

Corpus

Works
The Corpus is today composed of: 
 Divine Names;
 Celestial Hierarchy;
 Ecclesiastical Hierarchy;
 Mystical Theology, "a brief but powerful work that deals with negative or apophatic theology and in which theology becomes explicitly 'mystical' for the first time in history";
 Ten epistles.

Seven other works are mentioned repeatedly by pseudo-Dionysius in his surviving works, and are presumed either to be lost or to be fictional works mentioned by the Areopagite as a literary device to give the impression to his sixth-century readers of engaging with the surviving fragments of a much larger first-century corpus of writings. These seven other works are:
 Theological Outlines,
 Symbolic Theology,
 On Angelic Properties and Orders,
 On the Just and Divine Judgement,
 On the Soul,
 On Intelligible and Sensible Beings,
 On the Divine Hymns.

Dating
In attempts to identify a date after which the corpus must have been composed, a number of features have been identified in Dionysius' writing, though the latter two are subject to scholarly debate.
 Firstly, and fairly certainly, it is clear that Dionysius adopted many of his ideas—including at times passages almost word for word—from Proclus, who died in 485, thus providing at the least a late fifth-century early limit to the dating of Dionysius.
 In the Ecclesiastical Hierarchy Dionysius twice seems to allude to the recitation of the Creed in the course of the liturgy (EH 3.2 and 3.III.7). It is often asserted that Peter the Fuller first mandated the inclusion of the Nicene Creed in the liturgy in 476, thus providing an earliest date for the composition of the Corpus. Bernard Capelle argues that it is far more likely that Timothy, patriarch of Constantinople, was responsible for this liturgical innovation, around 515 — thus suggesting a later date for the Corpus.
 It is often suggested that because Dionysius seems to eschew divisive Christological language, he was probably writing after the Henoticon of Zeno was in effect, sometime after 482. It is also possible that Dionysius eschewed traditional Christological formulae in order to preserve an overall apostolic ambience for his works, rather than because of the influence of the Henoticon. Also, given that the Henoticon was rescinded in 518, if Dionysius was writing after this date, he may have been untroubled by this policy.
In terms of the latest date for the composition of the Corpus, the earliest datable reference to Dionysius' writing comes in 528, the year in which the treatise of Severus of Antioch entitled Adversus apologiam Juliani was translated into Syriac — though it is possible the treatise may originally have been composed up to nine years earlier.

Another widely cited latest date for Dionysius' writing comes in 532, when, in a report on a colloquy held between two groups (orthodox and monophysite) debating the decrees of the Council of Chalcedon, Severus of Antioch and his monophysite supporters cited Dionysius' Fourth Letter in defence of their view. It is possible that pseudo-Dionysius was himself a member of this group, though debate continues over whether his writings do in fact reveal a monophysite understanding of Christ. It seems likely that the writer was located in Syria, as revealed, for example, by the accounts of the sacramental rites he gives in The Ecclesiastical Hierarchy, which seem only to bear resemblance to Syriac rites.

Authorship
The author pseudonymously identifies himself in the corpus as "Dionysios", portraying himself as the figure of Dionysius the Areopagite, the Athenian convert of Paul the Apostle mentioned in Acts 17:34.

Various legends existed surrounding the figure of Dionysius, who became emblematic of the spread of the gospel to the Greek world. A tradition quickly arose that he became the first bishop of Cyprus or of Milan, or that he was the author of the Epistle to the Hebrews; according to Eusebius, he was also said to be the first bishop of Athens. It is therefore not surprising that that author of these works would have chosen to adopt the name of this otherwise briefly mentioned figure.

The authorship of the Dionysian Corpus was initially disputed; Severus and his party affirmed its apostolic dating, largely because it seemed to agree with their Christology. This dating was disputed by Hypatius of Ephesus, who met the monophysite party during the 532 meeting with Emperor Justinian I; Hypatius denied its authenticity on the ground that none of the Fathers or Councils ever cited or referred to it. Hypatius condemned it along with the Apollinarian texts, distributed during the Nestorian controversy under the names of Pope Julius and Athanasius, which the monophysites entered as evidence supporting their position.

The first defense of its authenticity is undertaken by John of Scythopolis, whose commentary, the Scholia, on the Dionysian Corpus constitutes the first defense of its apostolic dating, wherein he specifically argues that the work is neither Apollinarian nor a forgery, probably in response both to monophysites and Hypatius—although even he, given his unattributed citations of Plotinus in interpreting Dionysius, might have known better. Dionysius' authenticity is criticized later in the century, and defended by Theodore of Raithu; and by the 7th century, it is taken as demonstrated, affirmed by both Maximus the Confessor and the Lateran Council of 649. From that point until the Renaissance, the authorship was less questioned, though Thomas Aquinas, Peter Abelard and Nicholas of Cusa expressed suspicions about its authenticity; their concerns were generally ignored.

The Florentine humanist Lorenzo Valla (d. 1457), in his 1457 commentaries on the New Testament, did much to establish that the author of the Corpus Areopagiticum could not have been St. Paul's convert, though he was unable to identify the actual historical author. William Grocyn pursued Valla's lines of textual criticism, and Valla's critical viewpoint of the authorship of the highly influential Corpus was accepted and publicized by Erasmus from 1504 onward, for which he was criticized by Catholic theologians. In the Leipzig disputation with Martin Luther, in 1519, Johann Eck used the Corpus, specifically the Angelic Hierarchy, as argument for the apostolic origin of papal supremacy, pressing the Platonist analogy, "as above, so below".

During the 19th century modernist Catholics too came generally to accept that the author must have lived after the time of Proclus. The author became known as 'Pseudo-Dionysius the Areopagite' only after the philological work of J. Stiglmayr and H. Koch, whose papers, published independently in 1895, demonstrated the thoroughgoing dependence of the Corpus upon Proclus. Both showed that Dionysius had used, in his treatise on evil in Chapter 4 of The Divine Names, the De malorum subsistentia of Proclus.

Dionysius' identity is still disputed. Corrigan and Harrington find Pseudo-Dionysius to be most probably
 Ronald Hathaway provides a table listing most of the major identifications of Dionysius: e.g., Ammonius Saccas, Pope Dionysius of Alexandria, Peter the Fuller, Dionysius the Scholastic, Severus of Antioch, Sergius of Reshaina, unnamed Christian followers of everyone from Origen to Basil of Caesarea, Eutyches to Proclus.

In the past half-century, Alexander Golitzin, Georgian academician Shalva Nutsubidze and Belgian professor Ernest Honigmann have all proposed identifying pseudo-Dionysius the Areopagite with Peter the Iberian. A more recent identification is with Damascius, the last scholarch of the Neoplatonic Academy of Athens. There is therefore no current scholarly consensus on the question of Pseudo-Dionysius' identification.

The Stanford Encyclopedia of Philosophy claims:
 Others scholars such as Bart D. Ehrman disagree, see for example Forged. While the Pseudo Dionysius can be seen as a communicator of tradition, he can also be seen as a polemicist, who tried to alter Neo-Platonic tradition in a novel way for the Christian world that would make notions of complicated Divine Hierarchies more of an emphasis than notions of direct relationship with the figure of Christ as Mediator.

Thought
Dionysius attributed his inspiration to pseudo-Hierotheus, professing that he was writing to popularize the teachings of his master. Pseudo-Hierotheus was the author of "The book of Hierotheus on the hidden mysteries of the house of God." Pseudo-Hierotheus is believed to be the fifth century Syrian monk Stephen Bar Sudhaile.

The works of Dionysisus are mystical, and show strong Neoplatonic influence. For example, he uses Plotinus' well-known analogy of a sculptor cutting away that which does not enhance the desired image, and shows familiarity with Proclus. He also shows influence from Clement of Alexandria, the Cappadocian Fathers, Origen, and others.

Mystical Theology
According to pseudo-Dionysius, God is better characterized and approached by negations than by affirmations. All names and theological representations must be negated. According to pseudo-Dionysius, when all names are negated, "divine silence, darkness, and unknowing" will follow.

Influence

Eastern Christianity
His thought was initially used by Miaphysites to back up parts of their arguments but his writings were eventually adopted by other church theologians, primarily due to the work of John of Scythopolis and Maximus the Confessor in producing an orthodox interpretation. Writing a single generation at most after Dionysius, perhaps between 537 and 543, John of Scythopolis composed an extensive set of scholia (that is, marginal annotations) to the works of Dionysius.

These were in turn prefaced by a long prologue in which John set out his reasons for commenting on the corpus. All Greek manuscripts of the Corpus Areopagiticum surviving today stem from an early sixth-century manuscript containing John's Scholia and Prologue — so John of Scythopolis had an enormous influence on how Dionysius was read in the Greek-speaking world.

Theologians such as John of Damascus and Germanus I of Constantinople also made ample use of Dionysius' writing.

The Dionysian writings and their mystical teaching were universally accepted throughout the East, amongst both Chalcedonians and non-Chalcedonians. Gregory Palamas, for example, in referring to these writings, calls the author, "an unerring beholder of divine things".

The Corpus is also present in Syriac and Armenian versions, the former of which, by Sergius of Reshaina in the early sixth century, serves as a terminus ante quem for the dating of the original Greek.

There is a distinct difference between Neoplatonism and that of Eastern Christianity. In the former, all life returns to the source to be stripped of individual identity, a process called henosis, while in orthodox Christianity the Likeness of God in man is restored by grace (by being united to God through participation in His divine energies), a process called theosis.

Latin Christianity

Gregory refers occasionally in his writings to Dionysius, although Gregory's Greek was probably not adequate to fully engage with Dionysius's work. In the seventh and eighth centuries, Dionysius was not widely known in the West, aside from a few scattered references.

The real influence of Dionysius in the West began with the gift in 827 of a Greek copy of his works by the Byzantine emperor Michael II to the Carolingian emperor Louis the Pious. King Louis in turn gave the manuscript to the monastery of St Denys near Paris where, in about 838, Dionysius' works were translated into Latin for the first time by Hilduin, abbot of the monastery. It may well have been Hilduin himself who promoted his work (and his abbey) by developing the legend (which would be widely accepted during subsequent centuries), that Denis was the same person as Dionysius the Areopagite of Acts 17.34, and that he had traveled to Rome and then was commissioned by the Pope to preach in Gaul, where he was martyred. Hilduin's translation is almost unintelligible.

About twenty years later, a subsequent Carolingian Emperor, Charles the Bald, requested the Irishman John Scotus Eriugena to make a fresh translation. He finished this in 862. This translation itself did not widely circulate in subsequent centuries. Moreover, although Eriugena's own works, such as the Homily on the Prologue of St John, show the influence of Dionysian ideas, these works were not widely copied or read in subsequent centuries. The Benedictine monasticism that formed the standard monasticism of the eighth to eleventh centuries, therefore, in general paid little attention to Dionysius.

In the twelfth century, greater use gradually began to be made of Dionysius among various traditions of thought:
 Among Benedictines (especially at the Abbey of Saint-Denis), greater interest began to be shown in Dionysius. For example, one of the monks of Saint Denys, John Sarrazin, wrote a commentary on The Celestial Hierarchy in 1140, and then in 1165 made a translation of the work. Also, Suger, abbot of Saint-Denis from 1122 to 1151, drew on Dionysian themes to explain how the architecture of his new 'Gothic' abbey church helped raise the soul to God.
 Among the Canons Regular. Hugh of Saint Victor edited two commentaries on The Celestial Hierarchy between 1125 and 1137, later revising and combining them as one. Richard of Saint Victor was familiar with Dionysius through Hugh. Through Hugh, others became exposed to Dionysian thought, including Thomas Gallus and Gilbert de la Porrée.
 In the Cistercian tradition, it seems that early writers such as Bernard of Clairvaux, William of St Thierry and Aelred of Rievaulx were not influenced by Dionysian thought. Among second-generation Cistercians, Isaac of Stella clearly shows the influence of Dionysian ideas.
 It is in the Schools, though, that the twelfth-century growth in influence of Dionysius was truly significant. There are few references to Dionysius in scholastic theology during the tenth and eleventh centuries. At the beginning of the twelfth century, though, the masters of the Cathedral school at Laon, especially Anselm of Laon, introduced extracts from John Scotus Eriugena's Commentary on St John into the Sentences and the Glossa Ordinaria. In this manner, Dionysian concepts found their way into the writing of Peter Lombard and others.
 Bonaventure uses images and even direct quotations from Dionysius' Mystical Theology in the last chapter of his famous work Itinerarium Mentis in Deum (The Soul's Journey into God).

During the thirteenth century, the Franciscan Robert Grosseteste made an important contribution by bringing out between 1240 and 1243 a translation, with commentary, of the Dionysian corpus. Soon after, the Dominican Albertus Magnus did likewise. The thirteenth-century Parisian corpus provided an important reference point by combining the "Old Translation" of John Scotus Eriugena with the "New Translation" of John Sarrazin, along with glosses and scholia by Maximus the Confessor, John of Scythopolis and others, as well as the "Extracts" by Thomas Gallus, and several commentaries such as John Scotus Eriugena, John Sarrazin and Hugh of Saint Victor on The Celestial Hierarchy. It quickly became common to make reference to Dionysius. Thomas Aquinas wrote an explanation for several works, and cites him over 1700 times. Bonaventure called him the "prince of mystics".

It was subsequently in the area of mysticism that Dionysius, especially his portrayal of the via negativa, was particularly influential. In the fourteenth and fifteenth centuries his fundamental themes were hugely influential on thinkers such as Marguerite Porete, Meister Eckhart, Johannes Tauler, John of Ruusbroec, the author of The Cloud of Unknowing (who made an expanded Middle English translation of Dionysius' Mystical Theology), Jean Gerson, Nicholas of Cusa, Denis the Carthusian, Julian of Norwich, Harphius Herp and Catherine of Genoa ["The Mystical Element of Religion as Studied in Saint Catherine of Genoa and Her Friends (1908)]. His influence can also be traced in the Spanish Carmelite thought of the sixteenth century among Teresa of Ávila and John of the Cross.

Modern appraisal
In recent decades, interest has increased again in the Corpus Areopagiticum, for three main reasons: because of a recovery of the huge impact of Dionysian thought in later Christian thought, because of an increasing repudiation of older criticisms that Dionysius's thought represented a fundamentally Neoplatonic approach to theology, and finally because of interest in parallels between aspects of modern linguistic theory and Dionysius's reflections on language and negative theology.

Andrew Louth offers the following modern appraisal of the Areopagite;

See also
 Pseudepigrapha
 St. Dionysus Institute in Paris
 Theoria

Notes

References

Sources

 
 
 
Elena Ene D.-Vasilescu, "Pseudo-Dionysius the Areopagite and Byzantine Art", Journal of Early Christian History, Taylor & Francis, Volume 11, Issue 2, 2021, pp. 50-75; DOI: 10.1080/2222582X.2020.1743955 
 Elena Ene D-Vasilescu, "If you wish to contemplate God': Pseudo-Dionysius on the notion of will", Studia Patristica, vol. C (100), 2020: 247-257

Further reading

Greek editions
 Migne, Patrologiae Cursus Completus, Series Graeca III, (Paris, 1857) [Greek text]
 Beate Regina Suchla (ed.), Corpus Dionysiacum, 2 vols (Berlin: Walter de Gruyter, 1990–1) [the modern critical edition]
 La Hiérarchie Céleste, ed. Roques R, Heil G and Gandillac M, Sources Chrétiennes 58 (Paris: Les Éditions de Cerf, 1958) [Critical edition of the Celestial Hierarchy with French translation]
 Pseudo-Dionysius Areopagita, De Coelesti Hierarchia, London, 2012. limovia.net,

Modern translations
 Pseudo-Dionysius: The Complete Works, trans. Colm Luibheid (New York: Paulist Press, 1987) [The only complete modern English translation (and the only modern English translation of The Celestial Hierarchy), based almost entirely on the text in Migne]
 Dionysius the Pseudo-Areopagite: The Ecclesiastical Hierarchy, trans. Thomas L. Campbell, (Lanham, MD: University Press of America, 1981)
 Hathaway, Ronald F, Hierarchy and the definition of order in the letters of Pseudo-Dionysius. A study in the form and meaning of the Pseudo-Dionysian writings, (The Hague, Nijhoff, 1969), [Includes a translation of the Letters on pp130–160]
 Jones, John D, The Divine Names and Mystical Theology, (Milwaukee, 1980)
 Rolt, CE, The Divine Names and the Mystical Theology, (London: SPCK, 1920) [reprinted as Clarence Edwin Rolt, Dionysius the Areopagite on the Divine Names and the Mystical Theology, 2004, IBIS PRESS, ]
 The Works of Dionysius the Areopagite, trans. Rev. John Parker (James Parker and Co., 1897) Internet Archive

Secondary sources
 Bucur, Bogdan, ed., (Collegeville, MN: Cistercian Publications, 2014), a revised edition of Et Introibo Ad Altare Dei: The Mystagogy of Dionysius Areopagita, with Special Reference to Its Predecessors in the Eastern Christian Tradition (Thessalonika: Patriarchikon Idruma Paterikôn Meletôn, 1994)
 Coakley, Sarah and Charles M Stang, eds., Re-Thinking Dionysius the Areopagite, (Oxford: Wiley-Blackwell, 2008) [also published as Modern Theology 24:4, (2008)]
 Frend, W. H. C., The Rise of the Monophysite Movement (New York: Cambridge University Press, 1972).
 Golitzin, Alexander, Mystagogy: A Monastic Reading of Dionysius Areopagita. Cistercian Studies 250. 
 Griffith, R., "Neo-Platonism and Christianity: Pseudo-Dionysius and Damascius", in E. A. Livingstone, ed., Studia patristica XXIX. Papers presented at the Twelfth International Conference on Patristic Studies held in Oxford 1995 (Leuven: Peeters, 1997), pp. 238–243
 Hathaway, Ronald F., Hierarchy and the definition of order in the letters of Pseudo-Dionysius: A study in the form and meaning of the Pseudo-Dionysian writings (The Hague, Nijhoff, 1969)
 Ivanovic, Filip, Symbol and Icon: Dionysius the Areopagite and the Iconoclastic Crisis (Eugene: Pickwick, 2010). 
 LeClercq, Jean, 'Influence and noninfluence of Dionysius in the Western Middle Ages', in Pseudo-Dionysius: The Complete Works, trans. Colm Luibheid (New York: Paulist Press, 1987), pp. 25–33
 Louth, Andrew, Dionysius the Areopagite (London: Geoffrey Chapman, 1989). Reissued by Continuum Press (London & New York) 2001 under the title Denys the Areopagite.
 Perl, Eric D., Theophany: The Neoplatonic Philosophy of Dionysius the Areopagite (Albany: SUNY Press, 2007). .
 Rorem, Paul, Pseudo-Dionysius: A commentary on the texts and an introduction to their influence (New York: Oxford University Press, 1993)
 Rorem, Paul, and John C Lamoreaux, John of Scythopolis and the Dionysian Corpus: Annotating the Areopagite (Oxford: Clarendon Press, 1998)
 Scouteris, Constantine, Platonic Elements in Pseudo-Dionysius Anti-Manichaean Ontology, Ἐπιστημονική Ἐπετηρίς τῆς Θεολογικῆς Σχολῆς τοῦ Πανεπιστημίου Ἀθηνῶν, Τόμος ΚΘ΄, Πανεπιστήμιον Ἀθηνῶν, Ἀθῆναι 1994, pp. 193-201
 Scouteris, Constantine, "Malum privatio est": St. Gregory of Nyssa and Psedo-Dionysius on the Existence of Evil (Some further Comments), paper presented at the Ninth International Conference on Patristic Studies held in Oxford 1983, Studia Patristica, 18 (1990), pp. 539–550
 Stock, Wiebke-Marie, Theurgisches Denken. Zur "Kirchlichen Hierarchie" des Dionysius Areopagita (Berlin: de Gruyter, 2008) (Transformationen der Antike, 4)
 Elena Ene D-Vasilescu, "'If you wish to contemplate God': Pseudo-Dionysius on the notion of will", Studia Patristica, vol. C (100), 2020: 247–257

External links

 
 
 
 "Dionysius the Pseudo-Areopagite" in the Catholic Encyclopedia
 Commentary by Clarence Rolt (1920) on pseudo-Dionysius's works (available in PDF, HTML, and plain text formats) accessed September 1, 2006
 Works about Dionysius the Pseudo-Areopagite Christian Classics Ethereal Library
 The Identity of Dionysius Areopagite. A Philosophical Approach. Logos 1–2007.
 Pope Benedict XVI on Pseudo-Dionysius the Areopagite May 14, 2008, Zenit.org
 In Defense of the Dionysian Authorship Three essays from the Eastern Orthodox website Pravoslavie
 

External links to bibliography

 
 Mystical Theology (Theologica Mystica) accessed September 1, 2006
 Works (Corpus Areopagiticum) of pseudo-Dionysius including The Divine Names, Mystical Theology, Celestial Hierarchy, Ecclesiastical Hierarchy, and Letters (available in PDF, HTML, and text formats) accessed September 1, 2006 Christian Classics Ethereal Library
 De caelesti hierarchia 14th century Greek manuscript found at Constantinople, page images at Oxford Digital Library from Magdalen College, Oxford
 Theologia vivificans, cibus solidus; Dionysii Opera omnia ([reprod.]) / translatio per Ambrosium Traversarium; Jacobus Faber Stapulensis edidit – per Johannem Higmanum et Wolfgangum Hopylium (Parisius), 1498. http://gallica.bnf.fr/ark:/12148/bpt6k543103.r=.langEN accessed September 7, 2010.
 S. Dionysii Areopagitae martyris inclyti, athenarum episcopi, et galliarum apostoli opera ([reprod.]) / translatio nova Ambrosii Florentini,... – A. Wechelum (Paris), 1555. http://gallica.bnf.fr/ark:/12148/bpt6k52472f.r=.langEN accessed September 7, 2010.
 S. Dionysii Areopagitae Opera omnia, Georgii Pachymerae paraphrasi continenter illustrata / opera et studio Balthasaris Corderii,...; Patrologiae Graecae, Latine Tantum Editae, Tomus II. J. P. Migne (Petit-Montrouge), 1856. http://gallica.bnf.fr/ark:/12148/bpt6k411615d.r=.langEN accessed September 7, 2010.

5th-century Byzantine people
5th-century Christian mystics
5th-century Christian theologians
5th-century philosophers
6th-century Byzantine people
6th-century Christian mystics
6th-century Christian theologians
6th-century philosophers
Christian Greek pseudepigrapha
Christianity and Hellenistic philosophy
Hesychasts
Christian mystics
Neoplatonists
Philosophers of religion
Unidentified people